The 1904 United States presidential election in Utah was held on November 8, 1904, throughout all forty-five contemporary states as part of the 1904 United States presidential election. State voters chose three representatives, or electors to the Electoral College, who voted for president and vice president.

Background
In its first presidential election during its statehood year, Utah – with its large reserves of silver – had voted five-to-one for Democrat/Populist William Jennings Bryan, who ran on a platform of monetizing silver. However, with a revived economy, Utah moved much closer to the national mainstream in the ensuring 1900 election, as pre-statehood Republican Party hostility to the dominant LDS church gradually disappeared after the outlawing of polygyny in 1890.

In between Utah’s second and third presidential elections, newly elected but unseated senator and Mormon apostle Reed Smoot went much further towards reversing the nineteenth-century hostility of the Republican Party to the Latter Day Saints. At a time when most traditional Protestant congressmen were opposed to Smoot being seated because religious influence was feared, Mormon prophet and LDS Church President Joseph F. Smith said explicitly that members of the LDS Church should in political matters obey their consciences. Smoot – although a Republican – had been targeted by both major parties in the two years between his election by the Utah Legislature in 1902 and the 1904 presidential campaign, but he corresponded consistently with incumbent president Roosevelt.

Smoot’s work was one factor allowing Roosevelt to sweep twenty-six of Utah’s twenty-seven contemporary counties and carry the state by 28.55 percentage points, which even in the largest landslide since the beginning of widespread popular voting for presidential electors made Utah 9.73 percentage points more Republican than the nation at-large. Another was that Parker himself was hostile to Mormon polygyny, still another was the popularity in the West of Roosevelt’s conservation and trust-busting policies.

Roosevelt’s percentage of the popular vote and margin would be bettered by no Republican in Utah until Dwight D. Eisenhower’s re-election in 1956.

Results

Results by county

See also
 United States presidential elections in Utah

Notes

References

Utah
1904
1904 Utah elections